Shankar Nagarakatte (9 November 1954 – 30 September 1990) was an Indian actor, screenwriter, director, and producer known for his work in Kannada-language films and television. A popular cultural icon of Karnataka, Nag is often referred to as Karate King. He directed and acted in the teleserial, Malgudi Days, based on novelist R. K. Narayan's short stories.

Nag received the inaugural IFFI Best Actor Award (Male): Silver Peacock Award" at the 7th International Film Festival of India for his work in the film Ondanondu Kaladalli. He co-wrote 22 June 1897, a National award-winning Marathi film. He is the younger brother of actor Anant Nag. Vincent Canby, the chief film critic of The New York Times had opined that Shankar's performance in Ondanondu Kaladalli had the force and humor of the younger Toshiro Mifune.

Early career
Shankar Nagarkatte was born on 9 November 1954 in Honnavar, then a part of North Canara (now Uttara Kannada), in Bombay State (now in Karnataka). His parents were Anandi and Sadanand Nagarkatte. Born into a Konkani-speaking Brahmin family, his family settled in Shirali, a village near Bhatkal in Uttara Kannada of Karnataka State. He had an elder sister, Shyamala, and an elder brother, actor Anant Nag. After completing formal education, Nag moved to Bombay. There, he was attracted to Marathi theatre and immersed himself in theatrical activities. Incidentally, he met his future wife, Arundhathi during a drama rehearsal.

Nag then shifted base to Karnataka. His elder brother Anant had already established himself as an actor and urged Nag to act in films. In 1978 Nag made his debut in the role of a mercenary in Girish Karnad's epic film Ondanondu Kaladalli, where he played a mercenary who earns a position in a rival army to get even with his brother, whom he considers his enemy.

Acting and directing
Following the modest success of Ondanondu Kaladalli and the critical accolades he won, Nag appeared in other films. Seetharamu, Auto Raja and Preethi Madu Thamashe Nodu were amongst his early movies. He eventually became known for his action films, and while he had never undergone any martial arts training, he earned the nickname "Karate King".

He also made his directorial debut with Minchina Ota, one of the earliest heist movie in Kannada cinema. This won him seven state awards, including that for best film. Janma Janmada Anubandha and Geetha followed. There was no looking back after that.

Some of his most popular commercial movies as an actor include Nyaya Ellide, Nyaya Gedditu,Gedda Maga, Sangliyana and S. P. Sangliyana Part 2 and C.B.I. Shankar. He formed a popular pair with top actress Bhavya who acted with him in 11 films.

His directorial ventures include Accident, which won many state and national awards, Ondu Muttina Kathe, which was loosely based on John Steinbeck's novel The Pearl), Nodi Swamy Navirodu Hige, Lalach and Hosa Theerpu, which was a remake of Dushman.

Television and theatre
In 1987, Nag directed the Doordarshan series Malgudi Days, which was based on a collection of short stories by R.K. Narayan. The series featured Vishnuvardhan and Anant Nag, with music by was composed by L. Vaidyanathan. The series was shot in Agumbe, Shimoga district, Karnataka. Nag went to direct another teleserial, Swami, in the same year. Malgudi Days has been rated as one of the finest serials ever to be made in the history of Indian television.

He anchored the Parichaya program on DD1-Kannada, in its starting days.
Nag retained an interest in theatre. His brother Anant Nag and he founded Sanket, an amateur theatre group, which still produces plays. His first directorial effort in Kannada theatre was Anju Mallige by Girish Karnad. He continued with productions like Barrister, Sandhya Chhaya. He was later joined by T. N. Narasimhan, who wrote and co-directed Nodi Swamy Navirodu Hige which had, apart from himself, his wife Arundhati Nag and Ramesh Bhat in the cast.

Social work
Shankar Nag, was multi-faceted person, involved in various aspects of Karnataka's Infrastructure. He is credited with pioneering efforts in initiating 
 Rope Way/Cable Car to heighten the tourist experience at Nandi Hills
 Metro Train for Bengaluru
 Low Cost Houses that could be built in 8 days 
 Club for Amusement 
 Theater for performing Arts, including Drama

Death
Nag died in a car collision at Anagodu village on the outskirts of Davanagere town on 30 September 1990 during the pre-production work for his film Jokumaraswamy. His last film as an actor, Sundarakanda, was released a few days after his death. For Sundarakanda, Nag's voice was dubbed by Murali. Nigooda Rahasya, one of his last films also had his brother, Anant Nag, complete the voice dubbing.

Filmography

Television

Awards

National Film Awards 

 National Film Award for Best Children's Film (1986-87) for Swamy

 National Film Award for Best Film on Other Social Issues (1984-85) for Accident

Karnataka State Film Awards
 Best Second Film (1979–80) along with Anant Nag for Minchina Ota
 Best Screenplay (1979–80) along with Mariyam Jetpurwala for Minchina Ota
 Best First Film (1984–85) for Accident
 Best Director (1984–85) for Accident

Filmfare Awards South
 Best Director (1980) for Minchina Ota
 Best Film (1984) for Accident (1985 film)|

IFFI Award for Best Actor
 Silver Peacock Award for Best Actor (1979) for Ondanondu Kaladalli

References

External links
 

1954 births
1990 deaths
Indian male film actors
Male actors in Kannada cinema
Male actors in Marathi cinema
Kannada film directors
Kannada film producers
Road incident deaths in India
People from Uttara Kannada
IFFI Best Actor (Male) winners
Filmfare Awards South winners
Kannada male actors
20th-century Indian male actors
20th-century Indian film directors
Male actors from Karnataka
Male actors in Hindi television
Indian male television actors
Film producers from Karnataka
Film directors from Karnataka
20th-century Indian dramatists and playwrights
Screenwriters from Karnataka
Kannada screenwriters
Directors who won the Best Children's Film National Film Award
Directors who won the Best Film on Other Social Issues National Film Award
20th-century Indian screenwriters